The three-domain system is a biological classification introduced by Carl Woese, Otto Kandler, and Mark Wheelis in 1990 that divides cellular life forms into three domains, namely Archaea, Bacteria, and Eukaryota or Eukarya. The key difference from earlier classifications such as the two-empire system and the five-kingdom classification is the splitting of archaea from bacteria as completely different organism. It has been challenged by the two-domain system that divides organisms into Bacteria and Archaea only, as eukaryotes are considered as one group of archaea.

Background
Woese argued, on the basis of differences in 16S rRNA genes, that bacteria, archaea, and eukaryotes each arose separately from an ancestor with poorly developed genetic machinery, often called a progenote. To reflect these primary lines of descent, he treated each as a domain, divided into several different kingdoms. Originally his split of the prokaryotes was into Eubacteria (now Bacteria) and Archaebacteria (now Archaea). Woese initially used the term "kingdom" to refer to the three primary phylogenic groupings, and this nomenclature was widely used until the term "domain" was adopted in 1990.

Acceptance of the validity of Woese's phylogenetically valid classification was a slow process. Prominent biologists including Salvador Luria and Ernst Mayr objected to his division of the prokaryotes. Not all criticism of him was restricted to the scientific level. A decade of labor-intensive oligonucleotide cataloging left him with a reputation as "a crank", and Woese would go on to be dubbed "Microbiology's Scarred Revolutionary" by a news article printed in the journal Science in 1997. The growing amount of supporting data led the scientific community to accept the Archaea by the mid-1980s. Today, very few scientists still accept the concept of a unified Prokarya.

Classification 

The three-domain system adds a level of classification (the domains) "above" the kingdoms present in the previously used five- or six-kingdom systems. This classification system recognizes the fundamental divide between the two prokaryotic groups, insofar as Archaea appear to be more closely related to eukaryotes than they are to other prokaryotes – bacteria-like organisms with no cell nucleus. The three-domain system sorts the previously known kingdoms into these three domains: Archaea, Bacteria, and Eukarya.

Domain Archaea
The Archaea are prokaryotic, with no nuclear membrane, but with biochemistry and RNA markers that are distinct from bacteria. The Archaeans possess unique, ancient evolutionary history for which they are considered some of the oldest species of organisms on Earth, most notably their diverse, exotic metabolisms.

Some examples of archaeal organisms are:
 methanogens – which produce the gas methane
 halophiles – which live in very salty water
 thermoacidophiles – which thrive in acidic high-temperature water

Domain Bacteria
The Bacteria are also prokaryotic; their domain consists of cells with bacterial rRNA, no nuclear membrane, and whose membranes possess primarily diacyl glycerol diester lipids. Traditionally classified as bacteria, many thrive in the same environments favored by humans, and were the first prokaryotes discovered; they were briefly called the Eubacteria or "true" bacteria when the Archaea were first recognized as a distinct clade.

Most known pathogenic prokaryotic organisms belong to bacteria (see for exceptions). For that reason, and because the Archaea are typically difficult to grow in laboratories, Bacteria are currently studied more extensively than Archaea.

Some examples of bacteria include:
 "Cyanobacteria" – photosynthesizing bacteria that are related to the chloroplasts of eukaryotic plants and algae
 Spirochaetota – Gram-negative bacteria that include those causing syphilis and Lyme disease
 Actinomycetota – Gram-positive bacteria including Bifidobacterium animalis which is present in the human large intestine

Domain Eukaryota
Eukaryota are organisms whose cells contain a membrane-bound nucleus. They include many large single-celled organisms and all known non-microscopic organisms. A partial list of eukaryotic organisms includes:

Kingdom Fungi or fungi
 Saccharomycotina – includes true yeasts
 Basidiomycota – includes mushrooms
Kingdom Plantae or plants
 Bryophyta – mosses
 Magnoliophyta – flowering plants
Kingdom Animalia or animals
 Chordata – includes vertebrates as a subphylum
Kingdom Protista or protozoans
 Euglenoids – includes Euglena

Niches
Each of the three cell types tends to fit into recurring specialities or roles. Bacteria tend to be the most prolific reproducers, at least in moderate environments. Archaeans tend to adapt quickly to extreme environments, such as high temperatures, high acids, high sulfur, etc. This includes adapting to use a wide variety of food sources. Eukaryotes are the most flexible with regard to forming cooperative colonies, such as in multi-cellular organisms, including humans. In fact, the structure of a eukaryote is likely to have derived from a joining of different cell types, forming organelles.

Parakaryon myojinensis (incertae sedis) is a single-celled organism known to be a unique example. "This organism appears to be a life form distinct from prokaryotes and eukaryotes", with features of both.

Alternatives

Parts of the three-domain theory have been challenged by scientists including Ernst Mayr, Thomas Cavalier-Smith, and Radhey S. Gupta.

Recent work has proposed that Eukaryota may have actually branched off from the domain Archaea. According to Spang et al. Lokiarchaeota forms a monophyletic group with eukaryotes in phylogenomic analyses. The associated genomes also encode an expanded repertoire of eukaryotic signature proteins that are suggestive of sophisticated membrane remodelling capabilities. This work suggests a two-domain system as opposed to the three-domain system. Exactly how and when archaea, bacteria, and eucarya developed and how they are related continues to be debated.

See also 

 Bacterial phyla
 Eocyte hypothesis
 Taxonomy
 Two-empire system

References 

Biological classification
High-level systems of taxonomy
Biology controversies

de:Domäne (Biologie)
fr:Domaine (biologie)